Asty Dwi Widyaningrum (born 25 October 1999) is an Indonesian badminton player.

Achievements

BWF International Challenge/Series (1 title, 3 runners-up) 
Women's singles

  BWF International Challenge tournament
  BWF International Series tournament

Performance timeline

Individual competitions 
 Senior level

References

External links 
 

1999 births
Living people
People from Jayapura
Sportspeople from Papua
Indonesian female badminton players
20th-century Indonesian women
21st-century Indonesian women